Nandan Loganathan is an Indian actor who predominantly  works in Tamil serials and films. He has acted in Colors Tamil Vandhal Sridevi (2018-2019) and Chithiram Pesuthadi 2 (2019). He was ranked 14th in the list of "15 Most Desirable Actors in Tamil Television" released by the online daily The Times of India in 2018.

Early life 
Nandan Loganathan was born on September 14, 1987, in Chennai, Tamil Nadu to Loganathan and Kanaka. He received his bachelor's degree from Loyola College, Chennai.

Career
He co-starred with actress Lakshmi Priya in the 2017 short film  Lakshmi  directed by Sarujan. The short film was critically acclaimed and a success. It was followed by a series on Colors Tamil Vandal Sridevi starring Siddharth. He is currently playing lead role in Ilakkiya opposite Hima Bindhu.

He played the role of "Kadir" in the 2019 film Chithiram Pesuthadi 2.

Filmography

Serials and TV Shows

Movies

References

Tamil male television actors
21st-century Tamil male actors
Male actors in Tamil cinema
Living people
1987 births